Red Pearls is a 1930 British silent crime film directed by Walter Forde and starring Lillian Rich, Frank Perfitt and Arthur Pusey. It was made at the Nettlefold Studios in Walton. It was based on the novel Nearer! Nearer!  by J. Randolph James. The film was produced just as the change to sound films was taking place in Britain.

Premise
A Japanese merchant attempts to drive one of his rivals mad by impersonating a man he had once murdered.

Cast
 Lillian Rich as Sylvia Radshaw 
 Frank Perfitt as Gregory Marston 
 Arthur Pusey as Paul Gordon 
 Frank Stanmore as Martin Radshaw 
 Kiyoshi Takase as Tamira
 Gabrielle Brune
 Harold Saxon-Snell

References

Bibliography
 Goble, Alan. The Complete Index to Literary Sources in Film. Walter de Gruyter, 1999.
 Low, Rachael. Filmmaking in 1930s Britain. George Allen & Unwin, 1985.
 Wood, Linda. British Films, 1927-1939. British Film Institute, 1986.

External links

1930 films
British silent feature films
British crime films
British black-and-white films
1930 crime films
Films directed by Walter Forde
Films shot at Nettlefold Studios
Films based on British novels
Butcher's Film Service films
1930s English-language films
1930s British films